Michael Pope (25 February 1927 – 16 May 2016) was a British hurdler. He competed in the men's 400 metres hurdles at the 1948 Summer Olympics.

References

1927 births
2016 deaths
Athletes (track and field) at the 1948 Summer Olympics
British male hurdlers
Olympic athletes of Great Britain
Place of birth missing